Higazi Said (1916 – 30 August 1998) was an Egyptian swimmer. He competed in the men's 4 × 200 metre freestyle relay at the 1936 Summer Olympics.

References

External links
 

1916 births
1998 deaths
Egyptian male swimmers
Olympic swimmers of Egypt
Swimmers at the 1936 Summer Olympics
Sportspeople from Cairo
20th-century Egyptian people